Aaron James Nye (born 9 November 1978 in Brisbane, Queensland) is a professional Australian cricketer who played for Queensland between 2004 and 2008. He made his first-class debut for Queensland in March 2004 against New South Wales. Nye was not offered a Queensland contract ahead of the 2009–2010 season.

References

External links
 

Queensland cricketers
Living people
1978 births
Australian cricketers
Cricketers from Brisbane